This article lists fellows of the Royal Society elected in 1951.

Fellow 

Carlyle Smith Beals
Sir John Smith Knox Boyd
David Guthrie Catcheside
Arthur Herbert Cook
Sydney John Folley
Herbert Frohlich
Geoffrey Gee
Hans Arnold Heilbronn
Gerhard Herzberg
Sir Joseph Burtt Hutchinson
Harry Raymond Ing
David Lambert Lack
Thaddeus Robert Rudolph Mann
Kurt Alfred Georg Mendelssohn
Albert Neuberger
Leonard Bessemer Pfeil
James Arthur Prescott
Maurice Henry Lecorney Pryce
Sir William John Pugh
John Ashworth Ratcliffe
Thomas Alan Stephenson
William Homan Thorpe
Petrus Johann Du Toit
Alan Turing
Alfred Rene Jean Paul Ubbelohde

Foreign members

Herbert McLean Evans
Karl Spencer Lashley
Frederik Carl Mulertz Stormer
Ralph Walter Graystone Wykoff

Royal and statute 12 fellow 
 Prince Philip, Duke of Edinburgh

References

1951
1951 in science
1951 in the United Kingdom